The architecture of the United Arab Emirates has undergone dramatic transformation in recent decades, from operating as a collection of fishing villages to a global business hub known for its innovation and dynamism. Between the 1960s and 1970s, architecture in the United Arab Emirates (UAE) remained solely traditional, with narrow alleys and windtower houses still in use, reflective of a strong Bedouin heritage. Architecture is influenced by elements of Islamic, Arabian and Persian culture.

In the early 1970s, Sheikh Rashid bin Saeed Al Maktoum, the then ruler of Dubai, employed British architect John R Harris to create the stylish modernist architecture for which the major cities of the UAE are known today. The introduction of exposed glass curtain walls represented the beginning of a movement, used extensively in the design of almost every commercial and high rise building façade in the Persian Gulf. In less commercial areas, Emirati architecture continues to heavily reflects the custom and traditional lifestyles of the native people. Building materials are simple, in contrast with the refined images of Dubai and Abu Dhabi today.

Traditional influences
Traditional architecture in the United Arab Emirates was heavily influenced by the desert landscape, culture, lifestyle and available building materials. The Bedouin, a nomadic Arabic tribe who traditionally live in the desert were well known for using palm frond shelters, known as arish in the summer months. Frames for arish houses were often made with mangrove poles, imported from East Africa. In colder months, a move towards using animal skin shelters would be made. The Bedouin tent was a useful and adaptable structure often made of sheep wool, camels’ hair or goat hair by the women of the tribe. Such structures were called Bait al Sha’ar, meaning ‘House of Hair’. Other materials such as a mixture of seashells and limestone were used as building resources in the late 19th and early 20th centuries.

The nomadic nature of the Bedouin tribe demanded the need for light disposable materials that could be found along coastal lines. In contrast, permanent houses inland were constructed with a mud mixture formed into bricks, strengthened using stones bonded together with a mixture of red clay and manure. The geographical context of a tribe or group determined the type of materials that were used in the construction of buildings, meaning that most structures were made of materials drawn from the surrounding environment. These ranged from coral, mud and stone through to palm fronds and animal hair. The harsh climate of the United Arab Emirates created a need for ventilation due to high temperature periods of the year. This resulted in the introduction of Iranian windtowers, known as barjeels. These vertical shafts allow for a downward flow of cool air and a distribution of water to become available at the bottom of the structure, allowing for the inside temperature of the building to be cooled.

Ancient architecture in the United Arab Emirates 

While human settlement in the United Arab Emirates can be traced back to the Stone Age (6,000–3,200 BC), it was not until the Bronze Age (3,200–1,300 BC) that larger establishments began to form. Such settlements were developed in inland oases and coastal areas, populated by farmers, animal herders and fisherman. The first recorded large settlement was the town of Al Ain, through which inhabitants would export agricultural products through the port of Umm Al Nar, located off Abu Dhabi Island. This was a permanent establishment made up of well-constructed buildings built from cut and dressed stone, complete with circular tower-like tombs. Evidence from these sites indicates a strong trade evolving from pottery production and the export of copper, particularly between these settlements and surrounding civilisations such as Mesopotamia.

A water irrigation system known as qanat emerged in the Iron Age (1,300–300 BC). This system provided a relatively constant water supply all year round by taking advantage of underground water supplies, leading to a change in settlement patterns as groups would follow the route of the water source. Up until the mid 20th century (marking the beginning of Western attention to the area), most building fell into five categories: religious, residential, markets, public, and defensive buildings. Buildings that were constructed up until then remained within traditional styles. Unlike other styles of Islamic and Persian architecture, there is little ornamentation found in traditional architecture of the UAE. Only a small number of mosques offer any form of ornamentation, reflecting the lack of resources at hand and general reliance on simple but effective structures.

1980s and globalisation
The onset of the Globalisation era of the 1980s saw the United Arab Emirates become one of the most developed countries in the Persian Gulf region. The country saw a major economic boost with transforming into a commodity based economy, with shipments of oil and natural gas accounting for 40% of total exports and 38% of GDP. In the past two decades, significant effort has been made to diversify the economy and reduce dependency on oil revenues, with huge investments in tourism, financial and construction sectors. Since the late 1980s, architecture of the United Arab Emirates has become renowned for its urban image, becoming highly westernised but still retaining elements of traditional Emirati culture.

Economic development

Initial economic development in the UAE during the 1950s and 1960s was based heavily on the oil and gas industry, since diversifying into manufacturing, construction and commerce. The oil and gas sector accounts for approximately two thirds of the UAE’s revenue, employing one percent of the work force while Trades and Repairs Services, Construction ad Manufacturing account for 50% of the work force. In the past decades, high population growth in the UAE has been accompanied by high economic growth. GDP growth rate averaged 4.51% from 2000 until 2017, reaching an all-time high of 9.80% in 2006. This has been followed with a greater standard of living, with the current Human Development Index (HDI) standing at 0.863, ranking the UAE 34th in the world.

The overall economic outlook for the UAE is for continued growth with faster development than any other major Gulf State, encouraged significantly by tourism, manufacturing and financial sectors. In contrast to other countries in the Persian Gulf, in which oil wealth tends to be centralised around the governing royal family, the UAE aims to distribute and invest such wealth from natural resources into the infrastructure of the nation. Within the last 40 years, the government of the UAE has developed sufficient infrastructure for the Emirati population, including electricity, transport, housing, telecommunications and hospitals. These are all heavily subsidised. An open economic policy has allowed for multinational corporations to develop and operate through industrial and commercial businesses. This has resulted in the dynamic and internationally faceted infrastructure for which the UAE is renowned for. Additionally, the UAE has taken the commercial and technological resources offered by the West to promote and integrate their economy into a global setting.

Architecture of the state is heavily influenced by the inflow of wealth that has resulted from the economic boom of recent decades. Nonetheless, recent urban and commercial development in all major cities of the UAE continued to be influenced by Islamic architecture, giving these global metropoles a distinct Arabic background.

Major cities

Dubai 

Early construction after the expansion of Dubai as a global city paid little attention to traditional Islamic architecture and concerns for the environment were not considered. In the late 1980s and early 1990s, glass towers became prominent in the city of Dubai, all of which required enormous amounts of electricity to keep cool. Recently, builders and architects have become aware of both Arabic heritage and environmental concerns, leading to more harmonious development overseen by Dubai’s rulers in the last 20 years. Efficient heat resistant materials are increasingly used in construction, combined with traditional Arabic designs. This can be seen in the buildings for which Dubai has attracted worldwide attention for, including the Burj Khalifa and Burj Al Arab.

The Burj Khalifa was inaugurated in January 2010, unveiled as the world’s tallest freestanding structure at 829.8 m (2.722 ft.). The structure is host to several mixed facilities, including commercial shops, offices, entertainment venues and residential sectors. In designing the building, the lead architect Adrian Smith undertook elements of traditional Islamic architecture, which uses stepped ascending spirals. This reflected elements of Islamic design while creating a strategic shape to ensure the mass of the building reduces with height, allowing for a stronger and more fortified structure. The building supposedly ascends from a flower shaped based, imitating the Hymenocallis, a white lily native to the surrounding desert.

The Burj Al Arab (translated to ‘Arabian tower’) was designed by architect Tom Wright to resemble a J-class yacht. The structure is made of a steel frame exterior wrapped around a concrete tower, with white Teflon encased fibreglass forming the ‘sail’. The Burj Al Arab stands on an artificial island 280 m (918.6 ft.) from Jumeirah Beach. The architect claimed that "the client wanted a building that would become a symbolic statement for Dubai, similar to Sydney with its Opera House, London with Big Ben or Paris with the Eiffel Tower. It needed to be a building that would become synonymous with the name of the city." The building opened in 1999 after five years of construction.

Abu Dhabi
In 1967, Abu Dhabi's architecture was planned under the guidance of Zayed bin Sultan Al Nahyan by Japanese architect Katsuhiko Takahashi. In areas of high population density, there is a large amount of medium and high rise buildings, amongst the city’s notable skyscrapers; the Etihad towers, the National Bank of Abu Dhabi headquarters, the Abu Dhabi Investment Authority Tower, the Aldar headquarters and the Emirates Palace, heavily influenced by its Arab heritage.

Abu Dhabi is home to several supertall skyscrapers. The development of tall buildings has been encouraged in the Abu Dhabi Plan 2030. The expansion of Abu Dhabi’s central business district continues to grow, with several skyscraper buildings under construction in the city. Some of the tallest buildings in Abu Dhabi include the Central Market Residential Tower at 328m (1,253.28 ft.), The Landmark at 324m (1,062.99 ft.) and the Sky Tower at 310 m (1017.06 ft.).

In contrast to the heavily modernised skyscrapers of the city, the Sheikh Zayed Mosque continues to stand out as one of the most treasured sites of contemporary UAE society. Its design and construction began in November 1996, aiming to ‘unite the world’, employing artisans and materials from several countries including Germany, Italy, Turkey, Iran, Morocco, Pakistan, the UAE, Greece, New Zealand and China. The mosque is made of materials such as marble, stone, gold, ceramics and crystals, all chosen for their long-lasting qualities. As such, the structure is an ode to the globalised nature of modern architecture, but does by still incorporating many traditional facets of traditional Arabic design.

Rural Emirati architecture

In less commercialised areas of the United Arab Emirates, architecture remains largely traditional, with barjeel structures still in use for practical purposes. Much of the UAE’s traditional vernacular architecture developed in the 18th and 19th centuries remains in less westernised areas of the state. Such settlements are established in response to specific social and environmental conditions; homes, market places, mosques and fortified buildings are all reflective of the interconnected influences between a group’s culture and trade.

To this day, building materials are simple and reflective of resources at hand. The usage of stone guss, a lime mixture derived from seashells and a chalk and water paste is characteristic of more permanent inland houses. The structure of such houses is indicative of privacy and ventilation as central needs of the population, with high walls and limited visibility into buildings. Courtyard housing features are still utilised, designed to allow public interaction between male members of the household while preserving dignity and privacy of female family members. This is an example of traditional societal standards being well preserved through architectural fixtures in less commercialised areas. Rural and village architecture in the UAE is solely based on protecting occupants from the harsh environmental elements and climate of the geographical area. At a basic level, protection is needed from high temperatures, high humidity, high solar radiation, dust storms and desert winds. This is heavily reflected in the traditional and current use of courtyard houses and arish (houses built of palm tree leaves).

See also

 Culture of the United Arab Emirates
 Islamic architecture
 Persian architecture

References